Heathen Creek converges with House Creek by West Fulton, New York.

References 

Rivers of New York (state)
Rivers of Schoharie County, New York